The 1904–05 Welsh Amateur Cup was the fifteenth season of the Welsh Amateur Cup. The cup was won by Esclusham White Stars who defeated Bangor Reserves 4-0 in the final, at Wrexham.

First round

Second round

Third round

Fourth round

Fifth round

Semi-final

Final

References

1904-05
Welsh Cup
1904–05 domestic association football cups